This is a list of notable people associated with the Religious Society of Friends, also known as Quakers, who have a Wikipedia article. The first part consists of individuals known to be or to have been Quakers continually from some point in their lives. The second part consists of individuals whose parents were Quakers or who were Quakers themselves at one time in their lives, but then converted to another religion, or who formally or informally distanced themselves from the Society of Friends, or who were disowned by their Friends Meeting.

Quakers

A

B

C

D

E

F

G

H

J

K

L

M

N

O

P

Q

R

S

T

V

W

Y

People with Quaker roots
Individuals whose parents were Quakers or who were Quakers themselves at one time in their lives but then converted to another religion, formally or informally distanced themselves from the Society of Friends, or were disowned by their Friends Meeting.

See also

:Category:Quakers by century
Valiant Sixty
Quakers in science

References

External links
Adherents.com's Famous Quakers Page
Jenny's Famous Quakers Page
Some Quaker Writers and Artists of the Past

List
Quakers